The round ligament of the uterus is a ligament that connects the uterus to the labia majora. It originates at the junction of the uterus and uterine tube. It passes through the inguinal canal to insert at the labium majus.

The two round ligaments of uterus develop from the gubernaculum; they are the female homologue of the male gubernaculum testis.

Structure
The round ligament of the uterus originates at the uterine horns, in the parametrium. The round ligament exits the pelvis via the deep inguinal ring. It passes through the inguinal canal to reach the labium majus, inserting into the fibro-fatty substance of the labium majus.

Blood supply
The round ligament is supplied by the artery of the round ligament of uterus, also known as Sampson's artery.

Development
The round ligament develops from the gubernaculum which attaches the gonad to the labioscrotal swellings in the embryo.

Function
The round ligament of uterus acts to hold the uterus anterior-ward to in anteflexion and anteversion, especially by counteracting any posterior-ward forces that may be being exerted upon the uterus (e.g. distended bladder, or gravity while in a recumbent postition).

Pregnancy 
The round ligament maintains anteversion of the uterus during pregnancy.  Normally, the cardinal ligament is what supports the uterine angle (angle of anteversion). When the uterus grows during pregnancy, the round ligaments can stretch causing pain.

Additional images

See also
Round ligament pain

References

External links
 

Mammal female reproductive system